The Martina Apartments were a historic site in Miami, Florida. They were located at 1023 South Miami Avenue. On January 4, 1989, they were added to the U.S. National Register of Historic Places, but then they were demolished sometime before 2002.

References

External links
 Dade County listings at National Register of Historic Places
 Dade County listings at Florida's Office of Cultural and Historical Programs

National Register of Historic Places in Miami
Apartment buildings in Miami
Demolished buildings and structures in Miami